Yang Dae-hyuk is a South Korean actor. He is known for his roles in dramas such as The Third Charm, My Holo Love, 18 Again, Sweet Munchies and Three Bold Siblings.

Filmography

Television series

Film

References

External links 
 
 

1987 births
21st-century South Korean male actors
Living people
South Korean male television actors
South Korean male film actors